Baltic Proper covers the part of the Baltic Sea, from Åland Sea to the Danish sounds. Åland Sea, the Gulf of Finland and Gulf of Riga is not included. The border in the west to the Danish water is according to SMHI (Swedish Meteorological and Hydrological Institute) the same as the bridges over Great Belt, Little Belt and Øresund.

References 

Proper